Polish Theatre in Warsaw is a theatre in Warsaw, Poland. It is located at ul. Karasia 2. The current artistic director is Andrzej Seweryn.

The theatre was initiated by Arnold Szyfman and designed by Czesław Przybylski. Opened on 29 January 1913, the facility featured Poland's first revolving stage. It is a private enterprise staging Polish and foreign classics, contemporary drama, as well as popular plays.

The theater was  taken over by the Nazis and the building damaged during World War II. It was also the first theatre to be nationalized in Poland.

References 

 "Teatr Polski/Polish Theatre in Warsaw", culture.pl.
 Official Web Pages 

Theatres completed in 1913
Buildings and structures in Warsaw
Theatres in Warsaw
1913 establishments in Poland